T. bidentata may refer to:

 Tanaocheles bidentata, a crab in which the genital openings are on the sternum in females, but on the legs in males
 Trapezia bidentata, a guard crab
 Turneria bidentata, an ant with a single petiole
 Typhlolabia bidentata, a two-pronged bristletail